The 1999 Dreamland Egypt Classic was a women's tennis tournament played on outdoor clay courts in Cairo, Egypt that was part of Tier III of the 1999 WTA Tour. The tournament was held from April 19 through April 25, 1999. Arantxa Sánchez Vicario won the singles title.

Champions

Singles

 Arantxa Sánchez Vicario defeated  Irina Spîrlea, 6–1, 6–0
 It was Sánchez Vicario's 1st title of the year and the 85th of her career.

Doubles

 Laurence Courtois /  Arantxa Sánchez Vicario defeated  Irina Spîrlea /  Caroline Vis, 7–5, 1–6, 7–6(7–3)

Entrants

Seeds

Other entrants
The following players received wildcards into the singles main draw:
  Marwa El Wany
  Jelena Dokić

The following players received wildcards into the doubles main draw:
  Marwa El Wany /  Yomna Farid

The following players received entry from the singles qualifying draw:

  Mariam Ramon Climent
  Laurence Courtois
  Bahia Mouhtassine
  Ángeles Montolio

The following players received entry as lucky losers:
  Eva Bes Ostariz

The following players received entry from the doubles qualifying draw:

  Nadia Petrova /  Tina Pisnik

External links
ITF Source

Dreamland Egypt Classic
Dreamland Egypt Classic
1999 in Egyptian sport